Lotte Backes (May 2, 1901 - May 12, 1990) was a German pianist, organist, and composer.

Life
Backes studied piano from 1915 to 1917 in Strasbourg and from 1918 to 1922 in Düsseldorf. Afterwards, she performed in Germany and in Europe. From 1931 to 1990, she lived in Berlin. From 1935 to 1938. she studied composition at the Prussian Academy of Arts. She composed two operas, a symphony, and works for choir and organ. For her composing, she was awarded the Federal Cross of Merit.

References

External links
Twentieth-century music for trumpet and organ
The Musical Times, Volume 106

1901 births
1990 deaths
German women composers
Recipients of the Cross of the Order of Merit of the Federal Republic of Germany
20th-century women musicians